{{DISPLAYTITLE:Pi4 Orionis}}

Pi4 Orionis (π4 Ori, π4 Orionis) is a binary star system in the western part of the Orion constellation. It is visible to the naked eye with an apparent visual magnitude of 3.7. Based upon an annual parallax shift of 3.1 mass, it is located roughly 1,050 light-years from the Sun.

This is a spectroscopic binary star system with an orbital period of 9.5 days and an eccentricity of 0.03. The primary component is a B-type star with a stellar classification of B2 III. The stellar spectrum of π4 Ori A shows a strong depletion of the element boron. It has nearly 11 times the mass of the Sun and nine times the Sun's radius. The star is 15.4 million years old and has a projected rotational velocity of 38 km/s.

References

B-type giants
Spectroscopic binaries
Orion (constellation)
Orionis, Pi4
Orionis, 03
030836
022549
01552
Durchmusterung objects